Amsterdam Tigers are an ice hockey team in Amsterdam, Netherlands, playing in the First Division.

History
The Tigers existed in various guises from their foundation in 1963 until 2010 when the professional team folded, leaving only the amateur and junior teams. The team reformed in time for the 2014-15 Eerste Divisie season. The following season they moved up to the newly formed BeNe League, where they remained until the 2019-20 season.  

Ahead of the 2019-20 BeNe Season, the Tigers announced they would be leaving the league and joining the Dutch First Division. 

Upon reformation, the team was known as Amstel Tijgers Amsterdam before changing in 2017 to its present name. The amateur and junior teams have kept the Tijgers moniker. 

Over the years the names of the team have included: Amsterdam Bulldogs, Boretti Tigers, Amsterdam G's  and Al Capone Flames.

Eredivisie season results
Note: GP = Games played, W = Wins, OTW = Overtime Wins, OTL = Overtime Losses, L = Losses, GF = Goals for, GA = Goals against, Pts = Points

 *2 points deducted for forfeiting a game.

Roster 
Updated February 18, 2019.

Rivals
The Amstel Tijgers had a firm rivalry with the Tilburg Trappers. Usually the games between these two were tight and some hostility will be exchanged between players. Ever since the 2001-2002 season have the Amstel Tijgers been totally dominant  over their rivals and been the end-station for any play-off or cup run of Tilburg. However, during the last 2006-2007 season, the Trappers finally succeeded in eliminating their rivals from the play-offs.  However, the team began to perform poorly in the 2008-2009 season and were no longer contenders for the championship.  After a very poor season competitively and financially, the team dropped out of the Eredivisie in 2010.

Notable player rivalries of the past were:
Trevor Sherban (Ams) vs Casey Vanschagen (Til)
Karl Dykhuis (Ams) vs Peter van Biezen (Til)
Michael Pace (Ams) vs Jeff Trembecky (Til)
Kevin Hoogsteen (Ams) vs Bjorn Willemse (Til)
David Hoogsteen (Ams) vs Bjorn Willemse (Til)

Notable players
Ron Berteling Forward
Mark Bultje Forward
Tjakko de Vos  Defender
Karl Dykhuis  Defence
Andre Gill  Forward
Craig Sanders Forward
Willem van Rossum Defence

Former coaches
 Willem  Hoogervorst
 Mario de Vos
 Willem van Rossum.

Silverware
 Dutch National Championship:
1950, 1985, 2002, 2003, 2004, 2005

 Dutch Cup:
1939, 1980, 1985, 2000, 2003, 2004, 2005

 Cup of the Low Lands:
2004, 2005, 2006.

References

External links
 Amsterdam Tigers web site 
 Amateur Amstel Tijgers web site 

Ice hockey teams in the Netherlands
Ice hockey clubs established in 1963
Sports clubs in Amsterdam